Orophia tetrasticta is a species of moth in the family Depressariidae. It was described by Edward Meyrick in 1917, and is known from South Africa.

References

Endemic moths of South Africa
Moths described in 1917
Orophia
Moths of Africa